SNCP may refer to:

 Storage Networking Certification Program
 Subnetwork Connection Protection